I Used to Know Her: Part 2 is the fifth EP by American singer H.E.R., released on November 2, 2018, by RCA Records. It is the sequel to her previous EP, I Used to Know Her: The Prelude, also released in 2018.

Singles and promotion
On April 4, 2019, she released the music video for "Hard Place". She also performed the song live on The Late Show with Stephen Colbert, and the 2019 Grammy Awards.

Critical reception
Jackson Howard of Pitchfork gave a mixed review of the EP saying "Questionable sequencing otherwise plagues I Used to Know Her. The 15 collected songs of Volume 1 and Volume 2 bled into one another, a collage of intimate snapshots inside the H.E.R. orbit," and "The growing pains are evident. But at least H.E.R. is venturing into new subject matter."

Track listing

Charts

References

2018 EPs
Albums produced by D'Mile
Contemporary R&B EPs
RCA Records EPs
H.E.R. albums
Sequel albums